Several steamships have been named Baltic:

  — a wooden-hulled sidewheel steamer with the American Collins Line, which held the Blue Riband from 1851 to 1857
  — a passenger ship of the White Star Line which held the eastbound transatlantic record from 1873 to 1875
  — a White Star ocean liner which was the world's largest passenger ship in 1905
  — a Danish cargo ship sunk in a collision in 1924

Ship names